Landreau is a French surname. Notable people with the surname include:

Fabrice Landreau (born 1968), French rugby union player
Mickaël Landreau (born 1979), French footballer and manager

French-language surnames